Basilides and Potamiaena were Christian martyrs now venerated as saints. Both died in Alexandria during the persecutions under Septimius Severus.

Potamiana
Potamiana, (or Potamiaena)(d. ca. 205 AD), is venerated as a Christian saint and martyr.  According to her legend, she, along with her mother Marcella, were arrested in Alexandria, Egypt, and Potamiaena was threatened with being handed over to gladiators to be abused, if she refused to renounce her Christianity. The judge regarded her response as impious and ordered their immediate death by fire. Boiling pitch was subsequently dripped over her body.

Basilides
After Potamiana had been sentenced to death, Basilides, an officer of the court, led her to execution; on the way, he protected her against the insults of the mob. In return for his kindness Potamiana promised him not to forget him with her Lord when she reached her destination. 
Soon after Potamiana's death Basilides was asked by his fellow-soldiers to take a certain oath; on answering that he could not do it, as he was a Christian, at first they thought he was jesting, but seeing he was in earnest they denounced him and he was condemned to be beheaded.

While waiting in jail for his sentence to be carried out some Christians (Origen being possibly one of them) visited Basilides and asked him how he happened to be converted; he answered that three days after her death, Potamiana had appeared to him by night and placed a crown on his head as a pledge that the Lord would soon receive him into his glory. Basilides was then baptized and the next day he was beheaded.

Account by Eusebius
Potamiana appeared to many other persons at that time, calling them to faith and martyrdom (Eusebius, Church History VI, iii-v). To these conversions, Origen, an eyewitness, testifies in his Contra Celsum (I, 46; P. G., XI, 746).  The description of the episode of intercession of Potamiana on behalf of Basilides, narrated in Eusebius’ text, constitutes one of the first documents that concerns the intercession of saints.

Six Christians, students of Origen, were martyred at the same time.  Eusebius describes the martyrdom of this group:

Veneration
The martyrdoms of Basilides, Potamiana, Marcella and six disciples of Origen are commemorated in the Martyrologium Hieronymianum on June 28. The Roman Martyrology commemorates them on June 28, but Basilides on June 30.

In Italy, on September 2, 1948, Saint Basilides was declared patron saint of the Corpo degli Agenti di Custodia, today the Polizia Penitenziaria, the Prison Guards.

See also
Plutarch and companions

Further reading

Notes

External links
Potamiana
 Santa Potamiena d’Alessandria
 Butler, Alban. "SS. Potamiana or Potamiena, and Basilides, Martyrs"

Saints from Roman Egypt
3rd-century Christian saints
205 deaths
3rd-century Christian martyrs
Groups of Christian martyrs of the Roman era
Year of birth unknown
Ante-Nicene Christian female saints